The Heavenly King or variation may refer to:

 The Heavenly Kings, a 2006 Hong Kong film about the Four Heavenly Kings
 Heavenly Kings (चतुर्महाराज), the Four Heavenly Kings in Buddhism
 Heavenly King or Tian Wang (天王), a title in Chinese culture
 King of Heaven, a type of deity, a sky god

See also

 Four Heavenly Kings (disambiguation)
 Kingdom of Heaven (disambiguation)